"Frosty the Snowman"  is a popular Christmas song written by Walter "Jack" Rollins and Steve Nelson, and first recorded by Gene Autry and the Cass County Boys in 1950 and later recorded by Jimmy Durante in that year. It was written after the success of Autry's recording of "Rudolph the Red-Nosed Reindeer" the previous year; Rollins and Nelson shopped the new song to Autry, who recorded "Frosty" in search of another seasonal hit. Like "Rudolph", "Frosty" was subsequently adapted to other media including a popular television special.

Song 
A group of children find a hat and place it on Frosty's head. Frosty laughs and plays with the children until the hot sun threatens to melt him. Frosty says goodbye to the children, reassuring them, "I'll be back again someday."

It is generally regarded as a Christmas song, although Christmas itself is never mentioned in the lyrics. The action supposedly takes place in White Plains, New York, or Armonk, New York; Armonk has a parade dedicated to Frosty annually.

Covers 
The song was quickly covered by many artists including Jimmy Durante, Nat King Cole and Guy Lombardo. The versions by Nat King Cole and Guy Lombardo also reached the American charts. A Phil Spector-produced 1963 cover by The Ronettes is a popular version, featuring in Rolling Stone'''s list of "The Greatest Rock & Roll Christmas Songs".

The song has been covered as an instrumental by the Canadian Brass, with founder Charles Daellenbach taking on the persona of Frosty, and repeatedly calling "One more time!" ("You know what happens when Frosty gets 'hot'"), and then starting to collapse ("I think he's melting" -- "You know what happens when Frosty gets hot"). It was also covered by the Hampton String Quartet on their inaugural album, What if Mozart Wrote 'Have Yourself a Merry Little Christmas'. It was also recorded by American Brass.

The song has also been covered (with lyrics) by the band Cocteau Twins; the cover was released on their 1993 EP Snow. It was also covered by the Jackson 5 and appears on the Jackson 5 Christmas Album.

 Charts 

Certifications and sales
The Ronettes cover

 Book 
In 1950, Little Golden Books published Frosty the Snow Man as a children's book, adapted by Annie North Bedford and illustrated by Corinne Malvern.

 1950 short film 
In 1950, the UPA studio brought "Frosty" to life in a three-minute animated short which appears regularly on WGN-TV. This production included a bouncy, jazzy a cappella version of the song and a limited animation style reminiscent of UPA's Gerald McBoing-Boing. The short, filmed entirely in black-and-white, has been a perennial WGN-TV Christmas classic, and was broadcast on December 24 and 25, 1955, and every year since, as part of a WGN-TV children's programming retrospective, along with their two other short Christmas classics, Suzy Snowflake and Hardrock, Coco and Joe. The short had previously been telecast annually on WGN's The Bozo Show, Ray Rayner and His Friends, and Garfield Goose, along with its two other companion cartoons. The three cartoons are also a tradition on WJAC-TV in Johnstown, Pennsylvania, which not only broadcasts the cartoons on their station, but also makes them available on their website.

 Adaptations 
In 1969, Rankin/Bass Productions produced a 25-minute television special, Frosty the Snowman, featuring the animation of Japanese studio Mushi Production, and the voices of comedians Jimmy Durante as the narrator (who also sings a version of the song), Billy De Wolfe as Professor Hinkle and Jackie Vernon as Frosty. Paul Frees and June Foray both also voice characters including Karen and Santa Claus in this animated special produced and directed by Arthur Rankin Jr. and Jules Bass and designed by Mad artist Paul Coker, Jr.. This was a story based on the discovery of Frosty the Snowman.

Three sequels followed: 
 Frosty's Winter Wonderland (1976), based upon the song "Winter Wonderland"
 Rudolph and Frosty's Christmas in July (1979)
 The Legend of Frosty the Snowman (2005) Bill Fagerbakke took over as Frosty's voice after Vernon's death.Frosty Returns (1992) is a sequel to the original song, set in a separate fictional universe from the other specials, with John Goodman as the voice of a more sardonic Frosty defending the value of snow against Mr. Twitchell (Brian Doyle-Murray), the maker of a snow-removal spray.

On July 1, 2020, a live-action film adaptation of Frosty the Snowman was announced to be in development at Warner Bros. and Stampede Ventures, with Jason Momoa voicing the titular snowman, Jon Berg and Greg Silverman producing alongside Geoff Johns, Roy Lee and Momoa, and David Berenbaum writing the screenplay. Following Ray Fisher's accusation of mistreatment on the set of Justice League, Momoa defended Fisher and claimed that the Frosty the Snowman'' movie announcement was made without his permission and accused Warner Bros. of releasing the story in order to distract from Fisher's comments.

References

External links 
Frosty the Snowman at Don Markstein's Toonopedia. Archived from the original on July 30, 2016.

1910 Fruitgum Company songs
1950 singles
1950 songs
American Christmas songs
Bing Crosby songs
Christmas characters
Christmas novelty songs
Fictional humanoids
Fictional snowmen
Gene Autry songs
Jan and Dean songs
Kimberley Locke songs
Nat King Cole songs
Songs about fictional male characters
Songs written by Walter E. "Jack" Rollins
Jimmy Durante songs
Guy Lombardo songs
The Beach Boys songs
The Ronettes songs
Song recordings produced by Phil Spector
Song recordings with Wall of Sound arrangements
Songs written by Steve Nelson (songwriter)